Timothy Shuttleworth (born 24 April 1997) is a British swimmer. He competed in the men's 1500 metre freestyle event at the 2016 Summer Olympics.

References

External links
 

1997 births
Living people
British male swimmers
Olympic swimmers of Great Britain
Swimmers at the 2016 Summer Olympics
Place of birth missing (living people)
World Aquatics Championships medalists in open water swimming
British male freestyle swimmers
21st-century British people